The 1969–70 NCAA University Division men's basketball season began in December 1969, progressed through the regular season and conference tournaments, and concluded with the 1970 NCAA University Division basketball tournament championship game on March 21, 1970, at Cole Field House in College Park, Maryland. The UCLA Bruins won their sixth NCAA national championship with an 80–69 victory over the Jacksonville Dolphins.

Season headlines 

 UCLA won its fourth NCAA championship in a row, sixth overall, and sixth in seven seasons. In the Pacific 8 Conference, it also won its fourth of what ultimately would be 13 consecutive conference titles.
 The Pacific Coast Athletic Association began play. It was renamed the Big West Conference in 1988.
 LSU’s Pete Maravich established several NCAA records during his career. Two of the most notable came during this season — single-season scoring average (44.5, besting his 44.2 average from the prior season) and career scoring (3,667). In addition to leading the NCAA in scoring for the third consecutive season, Maravich was named a consensus first-team All-American and SEC Player of the Year for the third time.

Season outlook

Pre-season polls 

The Top 20 from the AP Poll and Coaches Poll during the pre-season.

Conference membership changes

Regular season

Conference winners and tournaments

Informal championships

Statistical leaders

Post-season tournaments

NCAA tournament

Final Four 

 Third Place – New Mexico State 79, St. Bonaventure 73

National Invitation tournament

Semifinals & finals 

 Third Place – Army 75, LSU 68

Awards

Consensus All-American teams

Major player of the year awards 

 Naismith Award: Pete Maravich, LSU
 Helms Player of the Year: Pete Maravich, LSU
 Associated Press Player of the Year: Pete Maravich, LSU
 UPI Player of the Year: Pete Maravich, LSU
 Oscar Robertson Trophy (USBWA): Pete Maravich, LSU
 Sporting News Player of the Year: Pete Maravich, LSU

Major coach of the year awards 

 Associated Press Coach of the Year: John Wooden, UCLA
 Henry Iba Award (USBWA): John Wooden, UCLA
 NABC Coach of the Year: John Wooden, UCLA
 UPI Coach of the Year: John Wooden, UCLA
 Sporting News Coach of the Year: Adolph Rupp, Kentucky

Other major awards 

 Frances Pomeroy Naismith Award (Best player under 6'0): John Rinka, Kenyon
 Robert V. Geasey Trophy (Top player in Philadelphia Big 5): Ken Durrett, La Salle
 NIT/Haggerty Award (Top player in New York City metro area): Jim McMillian, Columbia

Coaching changes 

A number of teams changed coaches during the season and after it ended.

References